In the AFL Women's (AFLW), the Melbourne best and fairest award is awarded to the best and fairest player at the Melbourne Football Club during the home-and-away season. The award has been awarded annually since the competition's inaugural season in 2017, and Daisy Pearce won the inaugural two awards.

Recipients

See also
 Keith 'Bluey' Truscott Trophy (list of Melbourne Football Club best and fairest winners in the Australian Football League)

References

Australian rules football awards
AFL Women's
Melbourne Football Club
Awards established in 2017
Australian rules football-related lists